The Voisin III was a French World War I two-seat pusher biplane multi-purpose aircraft developed by Voisin in 1914 as a more powerful version of the 1912 Voisin I. It is notable for being the aircraft used for the first successful shooting down of an enemy aircraft on October 5, 1914, and to have been used to equip the first dedicated bomber units, in September 1914.

Design

The first Voisin III was initially powered by a single  Salmson M9 engine water-cooled 9 cylinder radial engine, while later examples used the similar  Salmson P9 or R9. The pilot was ahead of the passenger, who could fire weapons, release bombs or take photos, depending on the mission. It incorporated a light steel frame structure which made it more durable when operating out of makeshift wartime military aviation airfields.

Many aircraft were armed with a Hotchkiss M1914 machine gun mounted on the fuselage operated by a standing observer.

Variants
 Voisin LA :Two-seat biplane bomber
 Voisin LAS :Improved version with raised engine installation

Operational history

As one of the main types that the French Aviation Militaire chose to standardize on in 1914, the Voisin III quickly became one of the most common Allied bombers early in the war. Significant numbers were purchased by the French and the Imperial Russian Air Force. Russia ordered more than 800 from France and built a further 400 under license at Anatra, Breshnev-Moller, Dux, Lebedev and Schetinin. Over 100 were built in Italy by Societe Italiana Transaera (S.I.T.), and 50 in the United Kingdom, while small numbers were purchased by Belgium and Romania. One French aircraft was forced to land in Switzerland in 1915 after running low on fuel in combat with a German aircraft and was put into service with the Swiss Fliegerabteilung.

Like many aircraft of its era, Voisin III was a multi-purpose aircraft. Its missions included day- and night bombing, reconnaissance, artillery spotting and training.

Fighter role

While flying a Voisin III, Sergeant Joseph Frantz and Corporal Louis Quénault of Escadrille V.24 shot down a German Aviatik B.I flown by Oberleutnant Fritz von Zangen and Sergeant Wilhelm Schlichting of FFA 18 over Jonchery, near Reims on October 5, 1914. This was the first time an aircraft had been brought down with small arms fire from another aircraft.

Quénault fired two 48-round magazines from an  Hotchkiss M1909 machine gun at the Germans who returned fire with rifles. When it jammed, he continued firing with a rifle until he succeeded in bringing them down.

Previously, Pyotr Nesterov had successfully brought down an enemy aircraft, however that was by ramming.

Bomber role
The Voisin III is notable in being among the earliest dedicated bombers.

France was the first country to organize dedicated bomber units, using the Voisin III. Three Escadrilles (squadrons) of the aircraft comprised the first bomber group, GB1 (groupe de bombardement 1), formed in September 1914 under the leadership of Commandant de Goÿs. de Goys’ contribution both as a tactical leader and theoretician is significant in developing the theory and practice of long range bombing sorties. An almost unopposed bombing campaign was conducted by GB1 during the early months of 1915, culminating in a retaliatory attack against the Badische Anilin Gesellschaft at Ludwigshafen, Germany, on 26 May 1915, shortly after the German Army introduced poison gas in battle. Of the 18 aircraft which took part, only Goÿs himself failed to return when his Voisin suffered a mechanical failure.

Following the success of GB1, other bomber groups were formed and successful daytime attacks on targets within Germany ensued throughout the summer and autumn of 1915. As many as 62 aircraft were involved. By 1916 the Voisin III was clearly obsolete and had become dangerously vulnerable to German fighter aircraft. With mounting losses, the Voisin III was withdrawn from daylight operations and restricted to night bombing. Among other types, it was replaced by the similar Voisin V.

Operators

 Aviation Militaire Belge
Escadrille 3
Escadrille 6

 Aéronautique Militaire
Army Co-operation units
Escadrille V.14
Escadrille V.21
Escadrille V.24
Bomber units 
Groupe de Bombardment GB 1
Escadrille VB.1 - later redesignated VB.101
Escadrille VB.2 - later redesignated VB.102
Escadrille VB.3 - later redesignated VB.103
Groupe de Bombardment GB 2
Escadrille VB.4 - later redesignated VB.104
Escadrille VB.5 - later redesignated VB.105
Escadrille VB.6 - later redesignated VB.106
Groupe de Bombardment GB 3
Escadrille VB.107
Escadrille VB.108
Escadrille VB.109
Groupe de Bombardment GB 4
Escadrille VB.110
Escadrille VB.111
Escadrille VB.112
 French Navy

 Servizio Aeronautico
1st Gruppo Squadriglia Aviatori (3rd Armata)
5a/25a Squadriglia
7a/27a Squadriglia - transferred to 2nd Armata
2nd Gruppo Aeroplani Undine (2nd Armata)
35a Squadriglia
303a Squadriglia
305a Squadriglia

 Corpul Aerian Român operated eight aircraft
Grupul 1
Grupul 2
Grupul 3

Imperial Russian Air Service
 2nd Army
 2nd Aviation Artillery Unit
 Imperial Russian Naval Air Service

 Serbian Aeroplane Escadre

Soviet Air Forces operated ex-IRAS aircraft until 1925.

 Fliegerabteilung operated one aircraft only

Ukrainian People's Republic Air Fleet operated six aircraft

 Royal Flying Corps received 50 aircraft built in the UK
4 Squadron RFC
5 Squadron RFC
7 Squadron RFC
12 Squadron RFC
16 Squadron RFC
No. 1 Reserve Airplane Squadron
No. 8 Reserve Airplane Squadron
No. 4 Wing
 Royal Naval Air Service operated 36 Voisin IIIs.
1 Wing
3 Wing
No. 8 Squadron

Survivors and replicas

An original 1915 Voisin III B.2/LAS, number 955, is on display at the Musée de l’air et de l’espace at Le Bourget near Paris.

A full-size Voisin replica is on display at the Pearson Air Museum in Vancouver, Washington however it only loosely represents the Voisin L/LA/LAS family and not a specific version.

Specifications (British-built Voisin LA)

See also

References

Further reading
 
 
 
 
 Grosz, Peter M. (2003). Aviatik B-types. Berkhamsted: Albatros Productions. Windsock Datafile No.102. . p. 4
 
 
 
 Taylor, John W. R., and Jean Alexander. "Combat Aircraft of the World" New York: G.P. Putnam's Sons, 1969 Library of Congress Catalog Card Number 68-25459 (Pg.131-132)

External links

 IWW Planes: Voisin III
 Voisin III
 Voisin III archived from www.csd.uwo.ca
 On Voisin aircraft archived from www.nasm.si.edu
  Voisin series of aircraft aviafrance.com
  Voisin III (LA) vel Wuala

03
1910s French bomber aircraft
Single-engined pusher aircraft
Biplanes
Military aircraft of World War I
Aircraft first flown in 1914

ja:ヴォワザン LAS (航空機)